The 1922 Colorado Silver and Gold football team was an American football team that represented the University of Colorado as a member of the Rocky Mountain Conference (RMC) during the 1922 college football season. In its third season under head coach Myron E. Witham, the team compiled a 4–4 record (2–3 against RMC opponents), finished sixth in the conference, and outscored opponents by a total of 79 to 56.

Schedule

References

Colorado
Colorado Buffaloes football seasons
Colorado Silver and Gold football